"Another World" is a song by The Chemical Brothers, and the third song and second single from Further, their seventh studio album released 14 June 2010. It lasts 5:40 but there is a shorter version featured on the single, video, and radio. The single was released on 18 August 2010 in the UK. The duo talked to Lauren Laverne on BBC Radio 6 Music about the song.

Music video
The music video is first featured in the Adam Smith and Marcus Lyal film Further, which is the second disc of the CD+DVD version of the Further album. The video is simply taken from that film the original part which featured "Another World" (17:04–22:44 in the original film).

Track listing
"Another World" (radio edit) – 2:57
"Swoon" (Boyz Noize summer remix) – 5:21
"Swoon" (Lindstrøm and Prins Thomas remix) – 9:27
"Horse Power" (Popof remix) – 6:35
The B-sides were originally featured on a 12" limited edition vinyl, and on individual download singles.

Chart performance

References

The Chemical Brothers songs
2010 singles
2010 songs
Songs written by Tom Rowlands
Songs written by Ed Simons
Parlophone singles